Donington Park is a motorsport circuit located near Castle Donington in Leicestershire, England. The circuit business is now owned by Jonathan Palmer's MotorSport Vision organisation, and the surrounding Donington Park Estate, still owned by the Wheatcroft family, is currently under lease by MotorSport Vision until 2038. It has a capacity of 120,000, and is also the venue of the Download Festival.

Originally part of the Donington Hall estate, it was created as a racing circuit during the period between the First and Second World Wars when the German Silver Arrows were battling for the European Championship. Used as a military vehicle storage depot during the Second World War, it fell into disrepair until bought by local construction entrepreneur Tom Wheatcroft. Revived under his ownership in the 1970s, it hosted a single Formula One race in 1993, but became the favoured home of the British round of the MotoGP motorcycling championship.

Leased by Donington Ventures Leisure Ltd in 2007 the hope that Formula One racing could return to the track, the incomplete venture failed to raise sufficient financial backing during the aftermath of the 2008 global financial crisis. DVLL consequently lost the rights to the British rounds of both Formula 1 and MotoGP series, and in its bankruptcy returned the track to the Wheatcroft family in December 2009.

Under Wheatcroft's ownership, the venue underwent significant work, with the track restored to use in autumn 2010, before major upgrades in the following five years. At the end of 2010, it was announced that Donington would become home to an annual historic motorsport event, the Donington Historic Festival, with new events constantly being added. Since 2010, significant investment across the venue has seen major improvements made to its infrastructure, while the circuit has become a regular fixture for top class motorcycling in the form of the Superbike World Championship.

In January 2017, the circuit business and a long-term lease on the estate was purchased by MotorSport Vision, with the purchase cleared by authorities in August of the same year. Significant investment has seen facilities at the venue brought up to modern standards, with a new restaurant, toilet blocks, large new grandstand and new circuit offices, as well as other detail changes. As well as improving the infrastructure, MSV made additions to the race calendar, with additional major events planned for 2019 which included extra rounds of the British Superbike Championship and British GT.

History

Creation, Pre-War racing
Donington Park motor racing circuit was the first permanent park circuit in England, which also ended the race circuit monopoly that Brooklands had held since 1907.

Fred Craner was a former motorcycle rider who had taken part in seven Isle of Man TT races, and was by 1931 a Derby garage owner and secretary of the Derby & District Motor Club. Craner approached the then owner of the Donington Hall estate, Alderman John Gillies Shields JP, to use the extensive roads on his land for racing.

The first motor cycle race took place on Whit Monday, 1931. For 1933 Craner obtained permission to build a permanent track, with the original layout widened and sealed at a cost of £12,000. The first car race was held on 25 March, followed by three car meetings further that year. The first Donington Park Trophy race was held on 7 October 1933, and the 20-lap invitation event was won by the Earl Howe in a Bugatti Type 51.

In 1935 the first  Donington Grand Prix was won by Richard "Mad Jack" Shuttleworth in an Alfa Romeo P3. In the 1937 Donington Grand Prix and 1938 Donington Grand Prix, the race winners were respectively Bernd Rosemeyer and Tazio Nuvolari, both in Auto Union 'Silver Arrows.'

The circuit at Donington Park was closed in 1939 due to World War II, when it was requisitioned by the Ministry of Defence and was converted into a military vehicle depot.

Wheatcroft revival (1971–2006)
In 1971 the park was bought by business man and car collector Tom Wheatcroft, who funded the rebuilding of the track. Wheatcroft moved his collection to a museum known as the Donington Grand Prix Exhibition which opened in 1973, and had the largest collection of Grand Prix cars in the world until its closure in 2018.

Wheatcroft had to battle against Leicestershire County Council, which had refused to allow planning consent for a return to racing, but Wheatcroft successfully appealed and had laid out the track by early 1976.

The first postwar race meeting was for motorcycles held on Sunday, 15 May 1977, organised by The Pathfinders and Derby Motor Club.  The motor racing circuit re-opened for cars on 28 May 1977, as per the original pre-war opening. The first postwar car race meeting was organised by the Nottingham Sports Car Club, sponsored by local Lotus dealers, J A Else of Codnor. That first car meeting nearly did not happen, as the local ramblers tried to assert their rights to retain access to footpaths at the eleventh hour. The meeting went ahead as a "Motor Trial", a legal loophole that curtailed the use of single seater racing cars for that opening meeting. The NSCC continued to run race meetings at Donington until the Donington Racing Club was formed and a licence to run race meetings obtained.

This shorter layout remains as the National circuit, which is used for most non-Grand Prix events.

In recent times Donington has held meetings of MotoGP, the British Touring Car Championship and British Superbike Championship, as well as the 1993 European Grand Prix.

Other events taking place at the track include a 1000 km endurance race for the Le Mans Series in 2006, the World Series by Renault and the Great and British Motorsport Festival. On 26 August 2007, the circuit hosted the British Motocross Grand Prix, with a purpose-built motocross circuit constructed on the infield of the road circuit.

Donington Ventures Leisure (2007–2009)
In 2007, Wheatcroft via the holding company Wheatcroft & Son Ltd, sold a 150-year lease on the land on which the track and museum are located to Donington Ventures Leisure Ltd (DVLL).

In July 2008, it was announced that DVLL had won the rights to the British Grand Prix for 17 years from July 2010, with North West Leicestershire council approving plans for the required track and facility rebuilt design by Hermann Tilke to be constructed from January 2009.

On 27 and 28 September 2008, the Motocross des Nations, the biggest and longest running event in World Championship Motocross, was at Donington Park.

it soon became clear that DVLL, led by Simon Gillett, was in serious financial difficulty. Chris Sylt, a respected journalist specialising in the financial side of Formula One, questioned Simon Gillett's track record, citing an earlier failure of his company Innovation Motorsport, owing £200,000, and his apparent lack of experience.

In April 2009, Wheatcroft & Son Ltd took legal action against DVLL in Derby County Court, seeking £2.47m in rent arrears, as well as forfeiture of the lease. The legal action put the future of the British Grand Prix in doubt, with Bernie Ecclestone restating that if Donington did not meet required standards to host the event, there will be no British Grand Prix from 2010.

On 5 June 2009, it was announced that an out of court settlement had been reached between Wheatcroft & Son Ltd and DVLL.

On 24 October 2009, media sources reported that Donington had failed to raise the £135 million needed to stage a British Grand Prix. The BBC commented in its coverage that: "Donington's bid looks over, and that Ecclestone has offered the race to Silverstone." Although DVLL gave further public relations assurance that it would be able to raise the required finance and host the Grand Prix, on 29 October 2009, Ecclestone confirmed that the British Grand Prix would not be held at Donington.

On 18 November 2009, the company went into administration with debts to contractors and suppliers approaching £4 million and a secured loan of £14 million with Anglo Irish Bank, according to the Administrator's report. . Acting chairman Mr Price said: "This need not be the end of Formula One racing at Donington. It still remains a fantastic location. It needs people of vision to get the dream to the starting grid. We are certainly hopeful that a 2011 Grand Prix could take place at the site."

On 7 December 2009, Formula One Management announced that Silverstone had been awarded a 17-year contract to hold the British Grand Prix from 2010 until 2026.

On 11 December 2009, it was announced that DVLL had lost the rights to hold the British Superbike Championship race due to be held on 10–12 September 2010. These dates will now be used for a race at Croft.

Return to Wheatcroft family (2009–2017)

On 24 December 2009 it was announced that a buyer for Donington Ventures Leisure had not been found, which thus meant that the 150-year lease given by Wheatcroft & Son Ltd to Donington Ventures Leisure was terminated. The ownership immediately reverted to Wheatcroft & Son Ltd, now led by Kevin Wheatcroft in light of the death of his father in 2009. Wheatcroft vowed to re-open Donington Park as soon as possible.
There were hopes to re-open the circuit in August 2010, and this was accomplished with the Donington Revival meeting.

On 26 May 2010 Wheatcroft announced that the lease for Donington Park had been sold (Subject To Contract) to Worcestershire-based Adroit Group. Adroit proceeded to resurrect the circuit, not only rebuilding the removed track sections, but also renewing infrastructure. This included the re-alignment of Foggy's bend, but not the old Dunlop Bridge due to new built MSA/FIA regulations. As a result of a series of inspections, the circuit successfully regained its ACU, MSA and FIA Grade 2 licences. However, Wheatcrofts and Adroit failed to agree terms of a final lease contract, and hence terminated their outline agreement.

The Wheatcroft-owned company Donington Park Racing took control of the circuit in late 2010, gaining events from both World Touring Cars and the World Superbikes, plus the inaugural Donington Historic Festival.

60 race days are held each year, including events from the British Touring Car Championship, British Superbikes, World Superbikes, British GT, rallying and historic festivals for both cars and motorcycles. Racing takes place on most weekends between March and October, with visits from most British racing clubs. Donington has also been host to the annual Season Launch for the BTCC since 2013, while the British Superbike Championship also holds major test days at the circuit.

The FIA Formula E Championship and its teams also constructed its headquarters at the circuit in the early years of its competition. All teams in the electric series were based at the venue, and Donington hosted several pre-season test dates before each season, some of which were open to spectators. For the 2017–18 season, the series switched their pre-season test venue to the Circuit Ricardo Tormo in Valencia, Spain.

Wheatcroft has also invested heavily to restore the circuit infrastructure to its former glories. The infield which was excavated during the late 2000s has been completely restored and raised even higher in some areas, while pit and paddock facilities have also been improved. Outside the circuit boundaries, an all terrain course has been constructed, as well as improvements to hospitality buildings and conferencing suites.

Purchase by MotorSport Vision (2017–present) 
In January 2017, the circuit business was taken over by MotorSport Vision, with the Donington Park Estate on a 21-year lease, until 2038. The purchase was cleared by the Competition and Markets Authority in August 2017, with work commencing almost immediately on venue improvements.

Additions over the winter period of 2017-18 included a full resurface of paddock areas and access roads, the addition of the Garage 39 Restaurant, cafe and bar, and a large new grandstand at Hollywood corner. Several old toilet blocks were also demolished to make way for more modern units. while detail changes were carried out around the venue. The circuit office was also relocated to a newer building within the paddock.

For 2019, work was completed on a new main entrance area near the existing paddock entrance, that better separates pedestrians from vehicle traffic.

In April 2021 MSV announced it had purchased the freehold of the Donington Hall Estate comprising Donington Hall itself, former office building Hastings House and the Lansdowne workshops building. The estate is set in 28 acres of grounds next to the Donington Park race circuit. MSV plans to develop the Grade II* listed Hall into a 40-bedroom hotel, scheduled to open in 2023. Hastings House will become the Donington Hall Motorhouse, a stabling facility for supercars, classic road and racing cars and motorcycles, whilst the Lansdowne workshops, will be available to let for high-end motor engineering businesses which support the preparation and maintenance of vehicles kept at the Donington Hall Motorhouse and used on the race circuit.

Motorsport at Donington

Donington Park has long been home to many prestigious motorsport events including BTCC, British F3, British Superbike Championship, WorldSBK, Superleague Formula, Truck Racing.

Formula One

1993 European Grand Prix

Donington Park was the host of the 1993 European Grand Prix on 11 April 1993, which was affected by rain. The race was notable for the dominance of Ayrton Senna where he won the race by over 1 minute from Damon Hill, having advanced from fifth to first in the opening lap.

This race was described by AtlasF1 as the 'Drive of the Decade'. There is a memorial to Senna in the grounds of the racetrack, outside the Donington Collections.

Failed 2010 British Grand Prix bid

On 4 July 2008, Bernie Ecclestone announced that Donington Park would hold the British Grand Prix from  onwards in a 17-year deal, having been hosted exclusively by Silverstone since 1987.

The proposal was that race would be the first to be accessed only by public transportation, as cars will not be allowed to enter the facility. This was in part was an answer to the lack of road access, which even when 30,000 bikers exit major motorcycle events resulted in long tailbacks. The proposal was that a shuttle-bus service would run from the close by East Midlands Parkway station, on the Midland Main Line from London to Sheffield.

In light of the financial crisis and Donington's potential inability to raise finance, on 20 June 2009, Bernie Ecclestone stated that there would be a British Grand Prix at Silverstone in 2010 if Donington was not ready to host it. This was a change from his previous "Donington or nothing" standpoint and he cited changes in the structure of the BRDC meaning there was a better way of negotiating with them over future commercial rights. Furthermore, during an interview with the BBC about the Formula One Teams Association threatening to break away and form their own series, FIA president Max Mosley said it was "highly likely" the 2010 British Grand Prix would return to Silverstone.

Donington was given an extended two-week deadline to prove it had the funds to host the 2010 British Grand Prix, however, on 22 October 2009, fundraising attempts fell through. Ecclestone later confirmed that Donington would not be hosting the British Grand Prix.

On 18 November 2009, less than one month after it was confirmed that the Donington had lost the right to host the British Grand Prix, circuit owner Donington Ventures Leisure Limited was placed into administration. Although Ecclestone gave the option of reviving the deal for new owners, in December 2009 Silverstone won the contract for the next 17 years.

Motorcycle Grands Prix (1987–2009)
Donington Park has also been the home of Grand Prix motorcycle racing. After the Isle of Man TT Races lost World Championship status, from the 1977 UK inaugural race, GP racing was held at Silverstone until 1986. For the next 23 years, Donington held the race up until 2009, but in light of the proposed Donington Formula 1 deal, Grand Prix organisers Dorna Sports agreed a five-year deal with Silverstone from 2010. Following the failed 2010 Formula 1 bid, in less than a year Donington had lost both competitions for the foreseeable future.

Donington Park was proposed to host the British Grand Prix as an alternative venue chosen for 2015, since the Circuit of Wales, having won the Dorna contract from 2015, was a failed proposal.  However, in February 2015, it was announced that Donington had called off the deal, and that 2015 Grands Prix would likely remain at Silverstone.

British Touring Car Championship (BTCC)
Donington Park has been a mainstay of the BTCC calendar, since the series was created in 1987 (as a development from the previous British Saloon Car Championship). In 1999 Donington was the location of one of the standout events from the BTCC's Super Touring era. Matt Neal caused a sensation by winning a race in his Nissan Primera, the first 'Independent' to do so in the modern era. This won him a £250,000 prize from BTCC series promoter Alan Gow.

FIA World Touring Car Championship (2011)
After five years at Brands Hatch, the WTCC moved to Donington Park in 2011. The event attracted thousands of people on race day, where the two races were both won by Yvan Muller for Chevrolet. The weekend also had two races for the Auto GP series as well as the Maserati Trofeo. The 2012 WTCC season did not include a UK-based round of the competition.

DTM
Donington hosted rounds of the German DTM (Deutsche Tourenwagen Masters) series in 2002 and 2003. Former F1 driver Jean Alesi secured a clean sweep of wins across both years for AMG Mercedes.

Rallying
The Park hosted a stage of the 1989 RAC Rally.
Donington is the venue for two rallies, with one of the events being a round of the MSN Circuit Rally Championship. These events do not take place exclusively on the circuit, including sections on the looser sections surrounding the track itself.

Sports Cars / GTs
Donington was one of the venues for the 2001 European Le Mans Series season. It was a series for Le Mans Prototypes (LMP) and Grand Touring (GT) race cars run by IMSA. The ill-fated series began in March 2001 and ended in October that year after only 7 races. The Donington winner was Audi Sport Team Joest with drivers Tom Kristensen and Rinaldo Capello.

Donington was also a venue for races in the FIA GT Championship from 1997 to 1999 and then 2002 to 2004.

Lap records

The unofficial all-time track record set during a race weekend is 1:10.458, set by Alain Prost in a Williams FW15C, during second (final) qualifying for the 1993 European Grand Prix. The official fastest race lap records at the Donington Park Circuit are listed as:

Layout history

Events

 Current

 April: British Touring Car Championship, F4 British Championship, Porsche Carrera Cup Great Britain, Donington Masters Historic, Donington Historic Festival
 May: British GT Championship, GB4 Championship, British Superbike Championship, Donington Historic Festival
 June: Donington Park Summer Race WeekendFerrari Challenge UK
 July: Superbike World Championship, Sidecar World Championship
 August: British Touring Car Championship, F4 British Championship, Porsche Carrera Cup Great Britain, British Truck Racing Championship
 September: TCR UK Touring Car Championship
 October: British GT Championship, GB3 Championship, GB4 Championship, British Superbike Championship, Britcar

 Former

 Auto GP (1999–2004, 2011, 2013)
 BPR Global GT Series (1995)
 BOSS GP (1995–2004, 2007–2008, 2011)
 Deutsche Tourenwagen Masters (2002–2003)
 Deutsche Tourenwagen Meisterschaft (1991, 1993–1995)
 EFDA Nations Cup (1996–1997)
 European Formula Two Championship (1977–1979, 1981–1984)
 European Le Mans Series 6 Hours of Donington (2006, 2012)
 European Touring Car Championship (1981–1988, 2002–2004)
 FIA European Formula 3 Championship (1977–1979, 1981–1984)
 FIA GT Championship (1997–1999, 2002–2004)
 FIA GT1 World Championship (2012)
 FIA Sportscar Championship (1997–2001, 2003)
 FIA Touring Car World Cup (1994)
 FIM Endurance World Championship (1981–1982, 1987)
 Formula One European Grand Prix (1993)
 Formula Renault Eurocup (2004–2007)
 Grand Prix motorcycle racing British motorcycle Grand Prix (1987–2009)
 IMSA European Le Mans (2001)
 International Formula 3000 (1985, 1987, 1990, 1993)
 Sidecar World Championship (1987–2001, 2008, 2014–2016, 2021–2022)
 World Series by Renault (2005–2007)
 World Sportscar Championship (1989–1990, 1992)
 World Touring Car Championship FIA WTCC Race of UK (2011)

Other events
Beside motorsports, many other events are held at Donington. The 1975 BMF Rally was held in the grounds with period reports of 10,000 motorcycle riders attending.

Other events included music festivals such as the Download Festival, and the Donington Grand Prix Museum exhibition until it closed down in November 2018. The Donington Park Sunday Market used to be held in the grounds of the park for nearly 40 years before being closed down in September 2016, the owners citing changing shopping habits contributing to fewer traders and customers.

Music festivals

Donington Park has a long history of holding rock festivals having played host to the Monsters of Rock festival from 1980 to the mid 90s, when groups such as AC/DC, Metallica, and Iron Maiden  performed there. With a few years off the park then played host to Stereophonics' A Day At The Races event and the Rock and Blues Festival in 2001, and the Ozzfest in 2002.

In 2003, the Download Festival (owned and operated by Live Nation) began annually at the venue and continues to an increased three-day event with five stages, though as of 2008 the event is now held outside of the track boundary.

Donington Park was the venue for the biggest rave to ever take place in the United Kingdom, when music promotor Fantazia held their 'One Step Beyond' event there in 1992. 25,000 tickets were sold, but police estimated that 3000 people had entered without tickets.

Donington Grand Prix Exhibition

The Donington Grand Prix Exhibition first opened to the public in March 1973. Five halls, with over 130 exhibits, illustrated the history of motor sport from the turn of the 20th century. Cars included examples driven by such famous names as Nuvolari, Mansell, Prost, Moss, Senna, Fangio, Clark and Stewart. The Donington Grand Prix Exhibition housed a collection of McLaren and Vanwalls racing cars. The Collection also featured the World's largest collection of Driver's Helmets. There were several different type of simulators that allowed users to experience the thrills of racing at speed.

After closing briefly in 2009 following the death of Tom Wheatcroft and Donington Ventures Leisure Ltd. entering administration, the exhibition reopened on 6 January 2010 along with the cafe and race control offices.  With dwindling visitor numbers,  and not being part of the core MSV business plan, the museum closed permanently on 5 November 2018.

Location

Donington Park lies south west of Nottingham, south east of Derby and is situated in Leicestershire. It is a matter of a few yards/metres east of the border with Derbyshire and indeed has a Derby postcode and telephone code. The western end of the runway at East Midlands Airport is just 400 yards from the eastern end of the racing track. It is also fairly close to the M1.

East Midlands Parkway railway station and Derby Midland Station are close by and the owners have expressed their desire for spectators to use these stations and coaches to the circuit. The owners are also in support of any future light rail transport to East Midlands Airport itself.

Donington Hall was, for a time, the HQ of the airline British Midland International (later known as BMI).

Media
Donington Park has been simulated and can be driven in several racing simulations, such as Spirit of Speed 1937 (the 1937 version of the track is featured, as the name suggests). Another 1937 layout features in the popular rFactor simulation. This version is far more accurate than that of the Spirit of Speed version. The track also features in Sports Car GT, Le Mans 24 Hours, ToCA Touring Car Championship, ToCA 2 Touring Cars, ToCA Race Driver, ToCA Race Driver 2, TOCA Race Driver 3, Alfa Romeo Racing Italiano, GTR, GTR2, GT Legends, F1 Challenge '99-'02 (with a mod), Grand Prix 4 (1993 configuration, unofficial add-on track), MotoGP 3, Redline, rFactor, SBK-07, Race Driver: GRID, Need for Speed: Shift, iRacing, Assetto Corsa (as a mod), Assetto Corsa Competizione (in British GT pack DLC), Automobilista 2, and Project CARS. Donington Park also appears as a venue in the game Guitar Hero: Metallica.

See also
Donington Grand Prix Collection

Notes

References

External links

Official Donington Park website
Donington Park Racing Association Club
Simulation of the new track layout by BBC News

Donington
Formula One circuits
Superbike World Championship circuits
Grand Prix motorcycle circuits
American Le Mans Series circuits
Motorsport venues in England
Sports venues in Leicestershire
Tourist attractions in Leicestershire
World Touring Car Championship circuits